Talvi may refer to:
People
 Aino Talvi (1909–1992), Estonian stage, film, and radio actress and singer
 Ernesto Talvi (born 1957), Uruguayan economist and politician
 Ilkka Talvi (born 1948), Finnish violinist and blogger 
  (1920-2007), Finnish writer
 Talvi Märja (born 1935), Estonian tennis player
 Tiina Talvi (born 1962), Estonian biologist and malacologist (:et)
Other
 Tämä ikuinen talvi, fourth demo album of the Finnish folk metal band Moonsorrow (1999)

Estonian-language surnames
Finnish-language surnames